Marist Prems is a football club from Tonga, currently playing in the Tonga Major League, the highest level of association football competition in Tonga.

History
The first record of Marist playing in the Tongan football league system is in 2006. Their final position is not known but, it is known that they beat the champions SC Lotoha'apai 4–0 in the final round of matches. Their most successful season to date was their championship win in 2009, where they ended Lotoha'apai's eleven year hold on the title, beating them into second place, with Manuka finishing third. they were unbeaten in the season in the first eight rounds of matches, finally losing 1–3 to Ngele'ia. In the 2013 season, they were one of only four teams to take part, this time finishing in third place, with Lotoha'apai United finishing first and Ha'amoko United Youth finishing second.
They won one of their four games, a 6–1 victory over Popua on the opening day of the season, drew the return fixture 0–0, but lost 0–2 to Lotoha'apai and 2–3 to Ha'amoko.

Honours
Tonga Major League:
Winner: 2009

Current squad
As of 2013 season:

References

External links

 Marist moving forward

Football clubs in Tonga